The 1973 U.S. Pro Tennis Championships – Singles was an event of the 1973 U.S. Pro Tennis Championships tennis tournament and was played on outdoor hard courts at the Longwood Cricket Club in Chestnut Hill, Massachusetts in the United States between July 16 and July 23, 1973. Bob Lutz was the defending U.S. Pro Tennis Championships champion but withdrew from his first-round match against Brian Gottfried. Jimmy Connors won the title by defeating Arthur Ashe 6–3, 4–6, 6–4, 3–6, 6–2 in the final.

Seeds

Draw

Finals

Top half

Bottom half

References

External links
 ATP results archive
 ITF tournament edition details

1973 Grand Prix (tennis)
U.S. Pro Tennis Championships